Juan Guzmán may refer to:

Sportspeople
 Juan Guzmán (baseball) (born 1966), former pitcher in Major League Baseball, primarily with the Toronto Blue Jays
 Juan Pablo Guzmán (born 1981), Argentinian professional tennis player
 Juan Reynoso Guzmán (born 1969), Peruvian retired football defender
 Juan Guzman (soccer) (born 1988), American soccer player
 Juan Guzman (boxer) (1951-2021), Dominican Republic boxer

Politicians
 Juan José Guzmán (1797–1847), President of El Salvador, 1842–1844
 Juan de Guzmán (died 1569), post-Conquest tlatoani (ruler) of the state of Coyoacan in the Valley of Mexico

Others
 Juan Guzmán (archbishop) (1572–1634), Spanish Roman Catholic archbishop
 Juan Guzmán (patriarch) (died 1605), Spanish Roman Catholic patriarch
 Juan Guzmán Tapia (1939–2021), Chilean judge
 Juan Guzmán (photographer) (1911–1982), German born Mexican photographer

See also
 Joan Guzmán (born 1976), flyweight boxer